Helen Tran is an American politician and the mayor of San Bernardino, California. Tran was elected in the 2022 San Bernardino mayoral election and is the city's first Asian American mayor.

Early life and education 
Tran was born to Vietnamese refugees in San Diego. She attended Cajon High School and became the first in her family to earn a college degree when she graduated from University of California, Santa Cruz with a bachelor's degree in American studies in 2004.

Career 
Tran worked for the City of San Bernardino for nearly fourteen years within human resources and served as the Director of that department for four years. In 2019 she worked for the City of West Covina as the Director of Human Resources and Risk Management. She has stated that she will resign from this role once her term in office begins.

References 

Living people
21st-century American politicians
21st-century American women politicians
American mayors of Asian descent
California politicians of Vietnamese descent
American women of Vietnamese descent in politics
Mayors of San Bernardino, California
Year of birth missing (living people)